"Lalíf", also known as "La-líf", is a song by the Icelandic pop band Smartbandið. It was composed by Kjartan Ólafsson for the band's 1985 album Smartband. After poor sales, the song became a hit in  1986, topping the Icelandic charts for several weeks. The song is known for being sung backwards.

In 2022, the song was feature in the Icelandic drama television mini-series Blackport.

Music video
A music video for the song was recorded in Netherlands and was directed by Sigrún Harðardóttir.

References

External links
Lalíf on YouTube

1985 songs
Icelandic songs
Pop songs